Jacques Dumont called "le Romain" (10 May 1704 — 1781), was a French history and portrait painter, called "the Roman" from his youthful residence at Rome and to distinguish him from other artists named Dumont, notably his fellow-academician Jean-Joseph Dumont. His father, Pierre, was a court sculptor to the Duke of Lorraine and his elder brother, François (1687/88—1726), was also a sculptor. In addition to his paintings he practiced etching, in which medium he reproduced some of his paintings and, for example, Servandoni's view of the fireworks celebrating the marriage of the dauphin, 1730. Though comparatively unknown today, he enjoyed celebrity and a long, successful career.

Pierre-Jean Mariette, who knew him well, reported that in his youth le Romain made his way to Rome by camping out; Mariette makes errors about his teacher in Rome, however. Dumont returned to Paris in 1725.

In 1727, he first showed at the Paris Salon and in 1728 he was received as a member of the Académie royal de peinture et de sculpture, with a Hercule et Omphale as his morceau de reception. At meetings he terrorized his fellow-academicians with his acerbic and caustic wit. When the engraver Le Bas was refused by the academicians, he remarked, "Stick a chalk-holder up his ass and he'll still draw better than you."

In 1731 he was appointed painter to the tapestry manufacture at Aubusson and served in that capacity until 1755, forming a school of designers there that raised standards of quality. His contract required six cartoons and three designs for pile carpets annually. Aubusson's rivals at the royal manufacture of the Gobelins gave him a back-handed compliment in a memoire to the royal administration dated 10 March 1754, and signed by Audran, Cozette and Neilson: "to prevent the decadence of the Gobelin Factory, it would be necessary to attach to it Sr. Boucher," giving him the assistance of other painters of the Académie such as "Sieurs Dumont Le Romain, Jeaurat, Halle, Challe, Vien."

When the official paintings school, the École royale des élèves protegés opened in January 1749, Dumont was appointed governor, but withdrew after three months, citing insufficient funds supporting the new institution.

His portrait of Mme Mercier, wetnurse to Louis XV, and her family, is conserved in the Louvre Museum. A brief catalogue of known works, from 1727 to 1761, was published in Guy Vattier, Une famille d'artistes: Les Dumont, 1660-1884 1890.

Notes

18th-century French painters
French male painters
1704 births
1781 deaths
18th-century French male artists